Lagomar is a residential neighbourhood and resort of Ciudad de la Costa in Canelones, Uruguay.

Geography
This resort is located just east of the Carrasco neighborhood (barrio) of eastern Montevideo, on the Río de la Plata coast.

History
The name of the resort is in association with the saline waters of the lake just north of Avenida Luis Giannattasio (lake by the sea, sea being the Rio de la Plata). Lagomar was created as a resort in 1952 and was developed as part of the Costa de Oro near Montevideo and Canelones. It changed its profile from the 1970s, when it gradually reached a breaking point because of population pressure, becoming a permanent residential area for the middle and upper middle classes. Between 1985 and 1996 the population grew 42%. To meet this population increase, in the second half of the 1990s it became further urbanized with shops and facilities. The resort became part of the Ciudad de la Costa by Act of October 19, 1994.

Population 
In 2011 Lagomar had a population of 8,066.

Source: Instituto Nacional de Estadística de Uruguay

Transport
Route 10 passes along the seafront leading from Carrasco, known as the Rambla de Montevideo. Lagomar is divided by the long Avenida Luis Giannattasio, along which are concentrated the main commercial and service activities of the place. The major roads named Rio de Janeiro and Buenos Aires connect this avenue to the Rambla on coast. On the northern rim of the resort is the west-east Ruta Interbalnearia.

Street map

References

External links
INE map of Colonia Nicolich, Paso Carrasco, Carrasco Int. Airport, and parts of the municipality of Ciudad de la Costa (incl. Lagomar)

Ciudad de la Costa